Hahira  is a city in northwest Lowndes County, Georgia, United States. The population was 2,737 at the 2010 census, up from 1,626 at the 2000 census.

Hahira has a mayor-council form of elected government. It is led by Mayor Bruce Cain and the four members of the City Council, elected from single-member districts. The city is mentioned in several songs by comedian/songwriter Ray Stevens, most notably the song "Shriner's Convention."

History
According to legend, the town of Hahira was named after a local cotton plantation. The planter was said to have named his estate after a West African village, Hairaairee, which was described to him by an English traveler. According to another version, the name may be derived from Hahiroth, a place mentioned in the Hebrew Bible.

The Georgia General Assembly incorporated Hahira in 1891.

Geography

Hahira is located at  (30.990537, -83.371433). U.S. Route 41 passes through the center of town as Church Street, leading north  to Cecil and south  to Valdosta, the county seat. Interstate 75 passes through the west side of Hahira, with access from Exit 29 (Georgia State Route 122). I-75 leads north  to Tifton and south past Valdosta  to Lake City, Florida. State Route 122 is Hahira's Main Street and leads east  to Lakeland and west  to Pavo.

Franks Creek runs through the westernmost part of the city and is part of the Little River–Withlachoochee River–Suwannee River watershed, flowing to the Gulf of Mexico.

Demographics

As of the census of 2000, there were 1,626 people, 643 households, and 448 families residing in the city. The racial makeup of the city was 73.49% White, 22.32% African American, 0.92% Native American, 0.31% Asian, 1.97% from other races, and 0.98% from two or more races. Hispanic or Latino of any race were 4.43% of the population.

There were 643 households, out of which 37.9% had children under the age of 18 living with them, 46.5% were married couples living together, 18.7% had a female householder with no husband present, and 30.3% were non-families. 27.7% of all households were made up of individuals, and 15.1% had someone living alone who was 65 years of age or older.  The average household size was 2.50 and the average family size was 3.08.

In the city, the population was spread out, with 29.4% under the age of 18, 8.1% from 18 to 24, 30.4% from 25 to 44, 18.4% from 45 to 64, and 13.8% who were 65 years of age or older.  The median age was 32 years. For every 100 females, there were 83.5 males.  For every 100 females age 18 and over, there were 80.8 males.

The median income for a household in the city was $27,946, and the median income for a family was $37,188. Males had a median income of $27,121 versus $18,981 for females. The per capita income for the city was $12,899.  About 13.9% of families and 17.6% of the population were below the poverty line, including 23.1% of those under age 18 and 19.6% of those age 65 or over.

Education
Students in Hahira are part of the Lowndes County School District. The following schools are in Hahira:

Hahira Elementary School
Hahira Middle School

The South Georgia Regional Library operates the Walter R. & Dorothy Salter Hahira Library. For many years, the public library of Hahira consisted of a few thousand books in a small room in City Hall, operated by Jackie Matthews and open only on Thursday afternoons. Then the state of Georgia launched a massive grant program to its cities, promising funds that would pay 90 percent of construction and furnishings to local governments that matched funds and provided land. Hahira citizens were divided down the middle, torn between serious water and sewage issues and their own public library. But in the end, Hahira, which was known during the 1920s as the Queen Bee Capital of the World, received a honey of a library, which opened on March 12, 1989. The library acquired its name from Walter R. Salter, a former mayor, councilman, and local business owner who had long desired a library for the community. Upon his death in 1984, his wife Dorothy came forward with a gift of $30,000. Dorothy was present at the library's formal dedication and Clara Vinson was named as the first manager. Salter Hahira Library is widely used by educators and home school families for its outstanding programs; the Salter Hahira Library has earned a reputation of utmost friendliness and hospitality. It has become, without a doubt, a true community center for Hahira's citizens, and a touchstone for storytelling enthusiasts, well worth the miles one must travel north to visit.  In 2010 the library received a renovation. done by Cauthan Construction Company, of the outside and inside worth $80,000.

Clothing ordinance
Citing public safety concerns, in March 2008, the Hahira City Council, with a vote by the mayor, passed a clothing ordinance that bans residents from wearing pants that have a top falling below the waist in fit and reveal skin or undergarments (see sagging). The council was split 2–2, and their tie was broken by the mayor in favor of the ordinance.

Notable people
Stephen Drew, J. D. Drew and Tim Drew, brothers and Major League Baseball players
Althea Garrison, city councilor, Boston, Massachusetts
Jerry Manuel, Major League Baseball manager
Mark and Dean Mathis, singers in the pop trio, The Newbeats, known for the song "Bread and Butter"
Gabe Nabers, Los Angeles Chargers football player
Lizz Wright, jazz singer and composer

Hahira Honey Bee Festival

Begun in 1981, the Honey Bee Festival is an annual event held during the first week of October. It has become one of the largest festivals in south Georgia, attracting thousands each year, and featuring arts, crafts, a beauty pageant and a parade. It is said that the Honey Bee Festival attracts close to 15,000 visitors.

Great Hahira Pick-In
From the early 1980s to the mid-1990s, Wilby and Gloria Coleman of Valdosta, together with family and friends, sponsored an annual bluegrass festival in Hahira. The Pick-In featured a weekend of bluegrass bands on the mountain stage as well as pickers and grinners in camp sites throughout the city. Citing falling revenues, organizers ended the Pick-Ins in the mid-1990s. In the Fall of 2009, Harvey's Supermarket sponsored a "Great Hahira Pick-In," before building a store on the traditional site of the festival.

References

External links

City of Hahira official website

Cities in Georgia (U.S. state)
Cities in Lowndes County, Georgia
Cities in the Valdosta metropolitan area